Akhlamad may refer to several villages in Chenaran Rural District, Central District of Chenaran County, Razavi Khorasan Province, Iran:
 Akhlamad-e Olya
 Akhlamad-e Sofla
 Dahaneh-ye Akhlamad